The 2014 Open Harmonie mutuelle was a professional tennis tournament played on hard courts. It was the eleventh edition of the tournament which was part of the 2014 ATP Challenger Tour. It took place in Saint-Brieuc, France between 31 March and 6 April 2014.

Singles main-draw entrants

Seeds

Other entrants
The following players received wildcards into the singles main draw:
  Jules Marie
  Mathieu Rodrigues
  Enzo Couacaud
  Tristan Lamasine

The following players received entry from the qualifying draw:
  Dominik Meffert
  David Rice
  Hugo Nys
  Toni Androić

Doubles main-draw entrants

Seeds

Other entrants
The following pairs received wildcards into the doubles main draw:
 Raphael Jannel /  Adrian Mannarino
 Grégoire Jacq /  Gleb Sakharov
 Tristan Lamasine /  Hugo Nys

Champions

Singles

 Andreas Beck def.  Grégoire Burquier, 7–5, 6–3

Doubles

 Dominik Meffert /  Tim Puetz def.  Victor Baluda /  Philipp Marx, 6–4, 6–3

External links
Official Website

Open Harmonie mutuelle
Saint-Brieuc Challenger
2014 in French tennis
April 2014 sports events in France
March 2014 sports events in France